Molecular Autism is a peer-reviewed open-access medical journal covering research on the cause, biology, and treatment of autism and related neurodevelopmental disorders. The editors-in-chief are Simon Baron-Cohen (University of Cambridge) and Joseph Buxbaum (Mount Sinai School of Medicine). The journal was established in 2010 and is published by BioMed Central.

Abstracting and indexing 
The journal is abstracted and indexed in:

External links 
 

BioMed Central academic journals
Creative Commons Attribution-licensed journals
English-language journals
Psychiatry journals
Publications established in 2010